Dean Road is a light rail stop on the MBTA Green Line C branch, located in the median of Beacon Street in Brookline, Massachusetts. The stop has two staggered side platforms, the platform before the grade crossing in each direction.

Dean Road is located one block from Beaconsfield station on the D branch of the Green Line, offering an easy transfer point. However, the interchange is outside of fare control; passengers must pay a second fare. Dean Road has no MBTA bus connections and is not handicapped accessible.

References

External links

MBTA - Dean Road
 Station from Google Maps Street View

Green Line (MBTA) stations
Railway stations in Brookline, Massachusetts